The Waldensian Evangelical Church (Chiesa Evangelica Valdese, CEV) is a Protestant denomination active in Italy and Switzerland that was independent until it united with the Methodist Evangelical Church in Italy in the Union of Methodist and Waldensian Churches. Founded in the 12th century by Peter Waldo as a proto-Protestant group, since the 16th century Reformation it has adopted Calvinist theology and blended into the wider Calvinist tradition. It is one of several Protestant denominations with pre-Reformation roots, and is appraised by various denominations of Protestantism as its major successor.

The Church, after the Protestant Reformation, adhered to Calvinist theology and became the Italian branch of the Calvinist churches. As such, the church is a member of the World Communion of Reformed Churches.

In 1967, the church had 30,000 members in Italy (plus some 15,000 affiliates in Argentina and Uruguay), and was a founding member of the Federation of Evangelical Churches in Italy (FCEI), an ecumenical body comprising mainly historical Protestant denominations. In 1975 the CEV united with the Methodist Evangelical Church (5,000) to form the Union of Methodist and Waldensian Churches.

See also

Peter Waldo
Waldensians
Religion in Italy
Christianity in Italy
Protestantism in Italy
List of Italian religious minority politicians
Colonia Valdense, town in Uruguay
John Charles Beckwith
Luserna San Giovanni 
Val Pellice
Waldensian valleys

References

External links
 

Protestantism in Italy
Reformed denominations in Europe
Religious organisations based in Italy
Members of the World Council of Churches
Waldensianism